Ivan Edwards FRSA is an American doctor, of Ugandan-European heritage, a former pastor, and a US Air Force Reserve flight surgeon, currently serving at the rank of lieutenant colonel.  He was involved in a community activist role in a neighborhood of Nashua, New Hampshire, and later organized a movement that opposed the sale of a historic cemetery in Uganda. He participates in public speaking. He is CEO and founder of Jovana Rehabilitation Medicine & Pain and IEME LLC, both located in San Antonio, Texas.

Background and education 
Edwards is of mixed Ugandan/European descent and experienced racial bias because of his multiracial background.  He lived in Uganda throughout the dictatorship reign of Idi Amin – a time of tribulation in which he experienced human rights abuses he described as "a common practice in the bloody dictator’s regime." In the late 1980s, he emigrated to the USA as part of the diaspora. His emigration was "in search for a better life, and an opportunity to develop [his] potential."

Edwards completed his university and medical school education in the United States, including an internship in internal medicine at Eastern Virginia Medical School in Norfolk and a residency in physical medicine and rehabilitation at the University of Texas Health Science Center at San Antonio. He is a board certified physiatrist with a specialty focus on neuro-rehabilitation and pain management, and promotes "a holistic approach to healthcare."

He accepted a direct commission as a medical officer in the US Air Force Reserve and had other additional specialized training at the Air Force School of Aerospace Medicine to become a flight surgeon.

Career

Medicine, advocacy, public speaking
Besides practicing medicine, both as a reserve flight surgeon and civilian physician, Edwards has appeared on local US and Uganda television to talk about topics on multiple sclerosis and self empowerment. He has also touched on issues of class privilege, social inequities and environmental degradation.

While in ministry in the early 1990s, he helped start a child sponsorship program that provided educational and financial resources to orphaned and displaced children facing poverty in Uganda.

Edwards has spoken at the Uganda Diaspora's international events held annually in Kampala, Uganda. On December 30, 2017, he was a special keynote speaker at the Ugandan diaspora event, after which he received the Ugandan Diaspora Award in recognition of his achievements and advocacy. Vice President of Uganda Edward Ssekandi (who presented him the award) and then-French ambassador to Uganda Stéphanie Rivoal  were in attendance.

On September 9, 2020, Edwards presented via webinar on the topic of post-traumatic stress disorder (PTSD), including the impact of COVID-19 on the local community, to an audience of nurses, social workers, case managers and other professionals—under the auspices of the Alamo chapter of the Case Management Society of America.

Military career
Edwards is an Alamo Wing flight surgeon at the 433rd Aerospace Medicine Squadron at Joint Base San Antonio at Lackland AFB. He joined the U.S. Air Force Reserves in 2004 after completing medical school. In 2008, he was first assigned to the 934th Airlift Wing at Minneapolis-St Paul Joint Air Reserve Station in Minnesota. In 2010, he was then reassigned to the Alamo Wing.

Some of his awards include the Air Force Commendation Medal, and the Military Outstanding Volunteer Service Medal.

Social activism

Community advocacy/leadership – Nashua, New Hampshire 
Edwards was involved in a community activist role in a Nashua, New Hampshire, neighborhood over the closure of a basketball court in a local park, a place purportedly attracting acts of vandalism, illegal activity and speeding. He came up with a petition, backed by some registered voters in the neighborhood community. Although the drive ultimately failed, it got the attention of top city officials, including Mayor Donald Davidson. The mayor instituted increased police patrols, in response to the community outcry.

Cemetery protest and vigil – Kampala European Cemetery, Uganda
Edwards organized a movement that opposed the sale of a historic cemetery in Kampala, Uganda, in April 2009. The Kampala European Cemetery, owned by the Kampala City Council, is a cemetery where prominent personalities in Uganda's colonial past, including some of Edwards' ancestral relatives, were laid to rest. The prospective buyers had planned to erect a shopping center to replace the cemetery—a move Edwards vowed to stop from materializing.

Edwards' family was reported to be the first to galvanize opposition to the sale of the historic Kampala European Cemetery. The Kampala City Council then denied the attempted sale and lease of the cemetery to foreign investors. In 2006, city council had received an offer to sell two historic cemeteries, including the Kampala European Cemetery. The offer was reportedly turned down because the council re-designated both cemeteries as tourist attractions.

The news of Edwards' protest and vigils reached the Goan community and beyond, which, in 1972, had been part of the Ugandan diaspora, including Ugandan-Asians (Expulsion of Asians from Uganda). The Goan Voice, announced the protest which helped propel the cause of preserving the cemetery.

By February 2013, due to press coverage and community outcry, the Kampala European Cemetery was finally slated for renovation and deemed a protected historical site.

Memberships 
Some of Edwards' memberships include:

Member of the American Academy of Physical Medicine and Rehabilitation
Member of the Aerospace Medical Association
Member of the Distinguished Society of USAF Flight Surgeons
Fellow of the American Academy of Physical Medicine and Rehabilitation

Awards 
According to Vitals Patient reviews, Edwards has received multiple Patients Choice Awards (2008–2011, 2013–2020) and Compassionate Doctor Recognition Awards (2010–2011, 2013–2020), among others.

In August 2021, Edwards was elected a Fellow of the Royal Society of Arts.

References

American people of Ugandan descent
United States Air Force Medical Corps officers
Year of birth missing (living people)
Living people
People from Kampala
Chicago College of Osteopathic Medicine alumni
Eastern Virginia Medical School alumni
University of Texas Health Science Center at San Antonio alumni